Martin Zdenek Bazant is an American chemical engineer, mathematician, physicist, and academic. He is the E. G. Roos (1944) Professor of Chemical Engineering and Mathematics at the Massachusetts Institute of Technology (MIT). From 2016 to 2020, he served as Executive Officer of the Department of Chemical Engineering.

Bazant is well-recognized for his teaching and research in electrochemistry, electrokinetics, transport phenomena, and applied mathematics. He was elected President of the International Electrokinetics Society and Fellow of the American Physical Society, the International Society of Electrochemistry, and the Royal Society of Chemistry. He is also the Chief Scientific Advisor of Saint-Gobain Research North America and Chief Scientist and co-founder of Lithios.

Education
Bazant earned a B.S. in Mathematics and Physics in 1992 and an M.S. in Applied Mathematics in 1993 from the University of Arizona. Subsequently, he undertook research in Physics for a Ph.D. at Harvard University, under the supervision of E. Kaxiras, and graduated in 1997. His dissertation was titled, Interatomic Forces in Covalent Solids. He then spent a year at Harvard as a Postdoctoral Fellow in Engineering and Applied Sciences under the guidance of Howard A. Stone.

Career
Bazant began his academic career in 1998 as an Instructor of Applied Mathematics at Massachusetts Institute of Technology. He was appointed as Assistant Professor of Mathematics in 2000 and promoted to Associate Professor in 2003. He joined the Department of Chemical Engineering in 2009 and built an experimental laboratory to compliment his theoretical research. He was promoted to full Professor in 2012 and named the inaugural Edwin G. Roos (1944) Chair Professor of Chemical Engineering in 2015. He has held visiting faculty positions as the Paris Sciences Chair at ESPCI Paris (2001, 2007-2008) and as the Global Climate and Energy Project Chair at Stanford University (2015-2016).

Bazant was the Executive Officer of the Department of Chemical Engineering at MIT from 2016 to 2020 and then created the new role of Digital Learning Officer. He has co-founded multiple research centers and serves as Director of D3BATT: Data-Driven Design of Rechargeable Batteries and of the Center for Battery Sustainability.

After organizing the 13th International Electrokinetics Symposium (ELKIN) in 2019, he co-founded the International Electrokinetics Society and became its first President.  He served as Associate Editor of SIAM Journal on Applied Mathematics from 2011 to 2021. He has consulted for Saint-Gobain Research North America on ceramics and plastics since 2008 and became Chief Scientific Advisor in 2013. He also advises Johnson Controls on healthy buildings.

Bazant co-founded two MIT startup companies: ICEO in 2005, which developed induced-charge electro-osmotic microfluidic devices, and Lithios in 2022, developing electrochemical lithium extraction.

Teaching
Bazant has created many open educational resources, including OpenCourseWare for Random Walks and Diffusion and Electrochemical Energy Systems. He is best known for advanced massive open online courses (MOOCs), notably 10.50x Analysis of Transport Phenomena. In 2018, Part 1: Mathematical Methods launched on MITx and edX, followed by Part 2: Applications in 2021. For 10.50x, he was awarded the MITx Prize for Teaching and Learning in MOOCs and finalist for the edX Prize.

In the first year of the COVID-19 pandemic, Bazant created a MOOC, 10.S95x Physics of COVID-19 Transmission, to teach the science of airborne transmission and advocate for physics-based safety guidelines.

Research
Bazant has authored several publications. His research spans the fields of electrochemistry, electrokinetics, fluid dynamics and transport phenomena in chemical engineering, applied mathematics, and theoretical physics. He has made advances in energy storage, water treatment, microfluidics, and nanotechnology and holds many patents.

In electrochemistry, Bazant is best known for the theory of electrochemical kinetics based on nonequilibrium thermodynamics and related phase-field models of lithium-ion batteries. By expressin]g overpotential and ionic activity in terms of functional derivatives of the Gibbs free energy, he generalized the Butler-Volmer equation and Marcus theory of electron transfer and formulated coupled ion-electron transfer (CIET) kinetics.[20], Predictions of the theory include intercalation waves, spinodal decomposition, and control of phase separation by electro-autocatalysis, e.g. in lithium iron phosphate (LFP). His models are used in computer simulations of batteries.

In electrokinetics, Bazant is known for developing models of the electrical double layer and various nonlinear electrokinetic phenomena. He analyzed ionic relaxation in response to large voltage pulses, leading to the first theory of capacitive deionization. His research introduced “induced-charge electro-osmosis” and produced new models, such as the Bazant-Storey-Kornyshev (BSK) equation, which describes over-screening in ionic liquids and the cohesion of cement.

In applied mathematics, Bazant extended conformal mapping to a class of non-harmonic functions, generalized diffusion-limited aggregation, and discovered exact solutions to the Navier-Stokes equations, some having steady vortex structures and others related to Poiseuille and Couette flows. He pioneered the use of matched asymptotic expansions in electrochemical engineering. He also developed algorithms to “learn physics from images”,  e.g. x-ray microscopy of LFP nanoparticles.

During the COVID-19 pandemic, Bazant developed a safety guideline to limit indoor airborne transmission, beyond arbitrary social distancing. The guideline was popularized by an online app and MOOC and used in controls for healthy buildings.

Awards and honors
2015 – Alexander Kuznetsov Prize in Theoretical Electrochemistry, ISE
2015 – Amar G. Bose Fellow, MIT
2018 – Andreas Acrivos Award in Chemical Engineering, AIChE
2019 – MITx Prize for Teaching and Learning in MOOCs

Selected articles
Bazant, M. Z., Thornton, K., & Ajdari, A. (2004). Diffuse-charge dynamics in electrochemical systems. Physical review E, 70(2), 021506.
Bazant, M. Z. (2004). Conformal mapping of some non-harmonic functions in transport theory. Proceedings of the Royal Society of London. Series A, 460(2045), 1433–1452.
Bazant, M. Z., Kilic, M. S., Storey, B. D., & Ajdari, A. (2009). Towards an understanding of induced-charge electrokinetics at large applied voltages in concentrated solutions. Advances in colloid and interface science, 152(1-2), 48–88.
Bazant, M. Z., Storey, B. D., & Kornyshev, A. A. (2011). Double layer in ionic liquids: Overscreening versus crowding. Physical review letters, 106(4), 046102.
Bazant, M. Z. (2013). Theory of chemical kinetics and charge transfer based on nonequilibrium thermodynamics. Accounts of chemical research, 46(5), 1144–1160.
Bai, P., Li, J., Brushett, F. R., & Bazant, M. Z. (2016). Transition of lithium growth mechanisms in liquid electrolytes. Energy & Environmental Science, 9(10), 3221–3229.
Bazant, M. Z. (2017). Thermodynamic stability of driven open systems and control of phase separation by electro-autocatalysis. Faraday discussions, 199, 423–463.
Bazant, M. Z., & Bush, J. W. (2021). A guideline to limit indoor airborne transmission of COVID-19. Proceedings of the National Academy of Sciences, 118(17), e2018995118.

References 

Massachusetts Institute of Technology faculty
American chemical engineers
American physicists
University of Arizona alumni
Harvard University alumni
Year of birth missing (living people)
Living people